Tecwyn is a Welsh given name and may refer to:

Tecwyn Evans (born 1971), New Zealand conductor
Tecwyn Ifan, Welsh singer and songwriter
Tecwyn Jones (born 1941), former Welsh professional footballer
Tecwyn Jones (footballer, born 1930) (1930–2008), Welsh professional footballer
Tecwyn Roberts (1925–1988), Welsh spaceflight engineer
Saint Tecwyn, the patron saint and founder of Llandecwyn in the Welsh county of Gwynedd
Richard Tecwyn Williams FRS (1909–1979), Welsh biochemist